

Melvin Joel Konner (born 1946) is an American anthropologist who is the Samuel Candler Dobbs Professor of Anthropology and of Neuroscience and Behavioral Biology at Emory University. He studied at Brooklyn College, CUNY (1966), where he met Marjorie Shostak, whom he later married and with whom he had three children. He also has a PhD from Harvard University (1973) and a MD from Harvard Medical School (1985).

From 1985 on, he contributed substantially to developing the concept of a Paleolithic diet and its impact on health, publishing along with Stanley Boyd Eaton, and later also with his wife Marjorie Shostak and with Loren Cordain.

Raised in an Orthodox Jewish family, Konner has stated that he lost his faith at age 17.

Selected bibliography
Konner, Melvin J. (2019) Believers: Faith in Human Nature. W. W. Norton & Company. 
Konner, Melvin J. (2015) Women After All: Sex, Evolution, and the End of Male Supremacy. W. W. Norton & Company. 
Konner, Melvin J. (2010) The Evolution of Childhood. Cambridge, MA : The Belknap Press of Harvard University Press. 
Konner, Melvin J. (2009) The Jewish Body. Knopf. 
Konner, Melvin J. (2003) Unsettled: An Anthropology of the Jews. New York : Viking Compass. 
Konner, Melvin J. (2002) The Tangled Wing: Biological Constraints on the Human Spirit, 2nd ed. (original 1982) New York: Times Books. 
Konner, Melvin J. (1993) Medicine at the Crossroads: The Crisis in Healthcare. Pantheon Books. 
Konner, Melvin J. (1990) Why the Reckless Survive . . . and Other Secrets of Human Nature. New York: Viking. 
Konner, Melvin J. (1987) Becoming a Doctor: A Journey of Initiation in Medical School. New York: Viking.

See also 
 Paleolithic diet
 Hunter-gatherer
 Stanley Boyd Eaton, researcher
 Loren Cordain, researcher
 Staffan Lindeberg, researcher

References

External links
 Melvin Konner's blog on anthropology and human nature
 Melvin Konner's blog on Jewish subjects

1946 births
American anthropologists
American psychiatrists
Jewish American social scientists
Emory University faculty
Harvard Medical School alumni
Brooklyn College alumni
Living people
Place of birth missing (living people)
Paleolithic diet advocates
21st-century American Jews